The Eastern Cape province of South Africa is divided, for local government purposes, into two metropolitan municipalities (Buffalo City and Nelson Mandela Bay) and six district municipalities. The district municipalities are in turn divided into thirty-one local municipalities.

In the following map, the district and metropolitan municipalities are labelled in capital letters and shaded in various different colours.

District and metropolitan municipalities

Local and metropolitan municipalities

Former municipalities
These municipalities have been dissolved since the current system of local government was established in 2000.

References

 
Eastern Cape
Municipalities